Heinrich Göbel, or Henry Goebel (April 20, 1818 – December 4, 1893) was a German-born American precision mechanic and inventor. In 1848 he emigrated to New York City, where he resided until his death. He received American citizenship in 1865.

In 1893, magazines and newspapers reported 25 years earlier, Göbel had developed incandescent light bulbs comparable to those invented in 1879 by Thomas Alva Edison. Göbel did not apply for a patent.

In 1893, the Edison Electric Light Company sued three manufacturers of incandescent lamps for infringing Edison's patent. The defense of these companies claimed the Edison patent was void because of the same invention by Göbel 25 years earlier, which came to be known as the "Göbel defense".

Judges of four courts raised doubts; there was no clear and convincing proof for the claimed invention. A research work published in 2007 concluded that the Goebel-Defense was fraudulent.

After Göbel's death, in some countries, the legend arose he was the true inventor of the practical incandescent light bulb.

Göbel acquired patents for an improvement of sewing machines (1865), for an improvement of the Geissler pump (1882) and for a technique to connect carbon threads to metal wires in incandescent lamps (1882). These three patents had no influence on further technical developments.

Biography

Springe, Germany 1818–1848 

On April 20, 1818, Heinrich Göbel was born in Springe near Hanover in Germany.  His father, Heinrich Christian Göbel, was a gardener and later a door-to-door salesman for chocolate. The name of his mother was Marie Eleonore née Hüper. At that time Springe was a small village in the Kingdom of Hanover with less than 2,000 inhabitants. Most of them worked in agriculture.

Heinrich Göbel finished school in 1832 with poor marks.  One teacher commented, "He seems to have an inventive mind. The reasons of the poor marks appear to be in his lengthy illness."

In 1834, master locksmith Gerhard Linde of Springe took on Göbel as an apprentice for three years. It is not known whether Göbel finished this apprenticeship.

Göbel started to work as a repair mechanic in 1837. Later in the 1850s in New York, he gave 1837 as the foundation date of his business on a business card of his shop.

In 1844, Göbel married Sophie Lübke née Rodewig. In the documents, he gave watchmaker as his profession at that time. There are no sources to confirm a training as watchmaker. Probably Göbel learned by doing and did work comparable to a precision mechanic. He operated a one-person business repairing and selling clocks. His son Johann Carl was born 1846, and his daughter Marie Sophie in 1848.

In 1848, at the age of 30, Göbel and his family emigrated to New York City. They left Germany in 1848 on the sailing ship J.W.Andrews, arriving in January 1849. According to the list of passengers of the ship, he gave "mechanic" as his profession. The reasons for emigration are not known.

New York 1849–1893 

In New York City, Göbel opened a shop in Monroe Street. The title was Jewelry, Horology and Optician's Store.

To earn more money, Göbel constructed a telescope. Frequently in the 1850s and 1860s he moved with his large telescope on a horse wagon to Union Square in the evening and by payment of a fee people could use his telescope to observe the stars. In litigations of the year 1893 many persons remembered the telescope-man.

On March 23, 1865, he took the oath on the Constitution of the United States of America and was henceforth American citizen. The document is signed with Henry Goebel. The change of name took place at an unknown time after 1852.

On May 9, 1865, Göbel obtained the U.S. Patent No. 47.632 "Hemmer for sewing machines."  Probably he got the idea when thinking about how to make the sewing work of his daughter more easy. He was not successful in selling the patent.

Göbel moved his shop to Grand Street 500 in 1872 and to Grand Street 468 in 1877.

In 1881, Göbel Goebel worked for the American Electric Light Co. Obviously there was a need for precision mechanics for the construction of electric lamps. Furthermore, he produced carbon filaments in his shop for the company.

He finished this work after half a year and tried to start his own business in the field of incandescent light bulbs together with his friend John Kulenkamp. Both were members of a Lodge of 
Freemasons of German immigrants.

On April 30, 1882 the New York Times reported on an exhibition of incandescent light bulbs in Göbel's shop. According to this report, Göbel claimed the electric light was by no means as new an invention as it was popularly supposed to be and that he knew this kind of light since his time in Germany. He affirmed he produced electric lights since the 1850s without giving technical details. The lamps at exhibition were incandescent light bulbs with carbon-filaments of high resistance made of fibres of reed.

Two patents were granted to Heinrich Göbel in 1882, an improvement of the Geissler system of vacuum pumps and a solution to connect carbon-filaments and metal-wires in a light bulb.

In 1882, Göbel offered to sell his inventions to the Edison Electric Light Co. for a few thousand dollars, but Edison did not see enough merit in the invention to accept the offer.

In the 1880s, some patent attorneys visited Göbel because of the 1882 New York Times story. They were interested in early incandescent light bulbs to put Edison's patent of 1880 into question. Later, they said, there was not much evidence, and Göbel was not able to present old lamps.

In 1887, Göbel's wife Sofie died. At least 8 more children of them were born in the US. 7 children survived both parents.

In the late 1880s, Göbel retired and his son Henry became the owner of the shop.

In 1893, New York patent attorneys Witter & Kenyon became defense counsel in three cases of patent infringement. Göbel became their primary witness, with his 1882 story used to create the Göbel defense.

Heinrich Göbel died on December 4, 1893, from pneumonia. He was buried at Green-Wood Cemetery.

The lawsuits with the Göbel defense continued until May 1894.

The work for the American Electric Light Co. 1881, the patents from 1882, and the report in the New York Times from April 30, 1882 are the earliest clear sources for work of Heinrich Göbel related to incandescent electric light bulbs. No earlier source is known to prove any kind of relation to incandescent light bulbs or any kind of work in the field of electricity. Doubtful details of the biography of Göbel given by himself are not listed.

The claimed Göbel anticipation concerning Edison's incandescent light bulb patents

Litigation using the "Göbel defense" in 1893 and 1894 

In 1892, the litigation Edison Electric Light Co. vs. United States Electric Lighting Co. from 1885 came to a final decision. The court confirmed the patents of Thomas Edison related to the incandescent light bulb.

Based on this decision, Edison Electric brought suits to obtain preliminary injunctions to close the productions of incandescent light bulbs of the Beacon Vacuum Pump and Electrical Company, Boston; Columbia Incandescent Lamp Company, St. Louis; and Electric Manufacturing Company, Oconto, Wisconsin.

Patent attorneys Witter & Kenyon became defense counsel in all three cases. They declared Edison's patents void because it was not a novelty in 1880. Their witness, Heinrich Göbel, made a claim he had designed the first practical incandescent electric light bulb in 1854. He said he had used his lamps for personal purpose without applying for a patent. The counsels called this an "overseen invention". Göbel was an unknown person at that time.

Göbel's main evidence was discounted by U.S. patent courts. Göbel himself was the most important witness of the defendant companies. Witter & Kenyon worked out an extensive defense with several hundred pages of affidavits. So-called Original Lamps  were presented at court. Witnesses said they existed earlier than 1880. Furthermore, so-called Reproduced Lamps were presented at court. Witnesses said Göbel had produced these lamps himself at Beacon Vacuum Pump and Electrical Company, using his old tools. In 1893, Heinrich Göbel was 75. He said that he had lost a lot of lamps and tools for the production of lamps when he left his shop in New York years ago.

In the case Edison Electric Light Co. vs. Columbia Incandescent Lamp Co., St. Louis 181 persons supported the Goebel-Defense providing affidavits and 142 persons supported the Edison view. The view of the Edison Electric Light Co. was Göbel did not built practical incandescent light bulbs before 1880. The counsels of the Goebel-Defense didn't provide any documentation or convincing proof which could be dated without any doubt to a time earlier than 1880, the year the patent was granted to Thomas Edison.

Many persons providing affidavits in 1893 said that they had seen the electric lamps of Henry Goebel in the 1850s to the 1870s. Henry Goebel used his lamps according to these affidavits for the advertisement of his shop in New York and for the advertisement of his telescope at Union Square, New York. Members of Goebel's family and friends of them affirmed the usage of incandescent lamps in the daily life of the family before the year 1880. The most surprising story for the public was the alleged usage of incandescent lamps for the advertisement of Goebel's telescope in the center of New York for years. It was said, thousands of New Yorkers had seen Goebel's lamps. Approximately 75 witnesses confirmed this in affidavits; approximately the same number of witnesses remembered oil-lamps only.

Goebel claimed his lamp contained a high resistance filament of carbon, platinum lead-in wires in an all-glass envelope, and a high vacuum produced with the Torricellian method using mercury. He tried several materials to produce the carbon filaments and discovered the advantages of bamboo. These solutions were exactly the results of the research work of the Edison Electric Light Co. and the novelties of Edison's patents.

Technical experts of both sides gave their opinion about the Goebel lamps and the claimed way of production in affidavits. Experts of the Edison side contested the quality of the lamps and the possibility to produce lamps using the affirmed procedure. Experts of the Goebel-Defense confirmed the quality of the lamps and the method of production.  Witnesses of the Goebel-Defense  said, that reproduced lamps burnt  45, 87 and 166 hours.  Edison's lamps burnt at time of applying for a patent approximately 40 hours. So-called Goebel Original Lamps were broken in 1893. Experts of the Edison side said that they never burnt.

Lewis Latimer, an employee of the Edison Electric Light Co. and responsible to support their counsels, discredited Goebel by demonstrating that his supposed 1870s bulb (Goebel Lamp No. 4) had been built much later.  Professor van der Weyde, an 80 years old physicist, said in his affidavit, he had seen Goebel's telescope and his incandescent lamps. Later he withdrew his affidavit. Witter & Kenyon expressed suspicions of bribery of witnesses. The newspapers reported about some turbulent phases in these lawsuits during the year 1893.

Judge Colt (Edison Electric Light Co. vs. Beacon Vacuum Pump and Electrical Company, Boston) explained how he ruled based on probabilities:

The opinion of Judge Hallett in the case Edison Electric Light Co. vs. Columbia Incandescent Lamp Co., St. Louis:

The opinion of Judge Seaman in the case Edison Electric Light Co. vs. Electric Manufacturing Co., Milwaukee:

The opinion of Judge Jenkins in the case Electric Manufacturing Co. vs. Edison Electric Light Co., appeal, Chicago was based on the last development of the Goebel-Defense with new affidavits and withdrawn affidavits in May, 1894:
 

A decision, whether the Goebel anticipation was held true or untrue, required a final hearing, but there was never a final hearing in the litigations using the Goebel-Defense. It was the responsibility of the Edison Electric Light Co. to move the case in St. Louis to a final hearing. Probably they did it not because of the expiry date of Edison's patent in 1894 and high cost.

It is not sure, that the proof of the alleged anticipation was the true strategy of the counsels of the defense. Perhaps the aim of the extensive Goebel-Defense was to avoid a decision of a final hearing before the expiry date of Edison's patent. This was successful in the case of the Columbia Incandescent Lamp Co. The company produced lamps without interruption though they never proved the invalidity of Edison's patent.

In two cases the preliminary injunction was granted, in one case the injunction was denied. In Philadelphia another injunction was granted in a suit filed by the Edison Electric Light Co. to stop the usage of patent infringing lamps at some companies. The counsels of the defense in this case used the arguments of the Goebel-Defense. The judges referred to the previous decisions. They did not form their own opinion about the Goebel claim of anticipation.

The point of controversy in these lawsuits between the Edison Electric Light Co. and their competitors was money. It was not a controversy about the honor to be the inventor of the incandescent light bulb. There was no benefit for Henry Goebel in these suits. He said, he was not interested in the decisions of the courts and that he had no hostile mind towards Thomas Edison. In an affidavit he said he got no money for providing details of his work concerning incandescent lamps.

The claim of the Goebel Defense fulfilled the legal requirements for challenging the Edison patent without having to assert any influence or effect of the alleged invention outside the private sphere of Goebel. An invention with merit of technical progress for the benefit of the general public, however, was not claimed.

Historical extrajudicial investigations and views on the anticipation claim 
During the litigations most newspapers reported with a neutral point of view, but some raised doubts about the alleged Goebel anticipation.

"A romantic story of the poor inventor Goebel which will be forgotten soon" was the commentary of a technical magazine in Germany.

The journalist A.M.Tanner from London visited Springe, Goebel's native town, and interviewed some people there. In his article published in The Electrical Review in February 1894 he wrote, that nobody had confirmed the alleged work of Goebel related to electricity before leaving Germany. Tanner reported, Goebel's alleged teacher in the field of electricity and electric lamps, Professor Münchhausen, was an unknown person in Springe and Hanover. Goebel said in one of his affidavits, that he had learned the professions of a watchmaker and an optician. In Springe Tanner got the information, that Goebel had learned the profession of a locksmith.

Investigations in recent years 

Investigations in recent years partially corroborated the findings in the article by Tanner.

One important point is, that there is no source to confirm Goebel's alleged source of knowledge in the fields of electricity and vacuum physics. Goebel claimed that he had worked together with a certain Professor Münchhausen in the 1840s, that he had constructed equipment for experiments at today's Leibniz University Hannover (at that time called Höhere Gewerbeschule), that he had assisted experiments related to electric light, that he had got the idea and the basic concept of the design of an electric incandescent lamp from Professor Münchhausen and that he had continued with experiments on electric light on his own in New York. A person Professor Münchhausen was not known in the Kingdom of Hanover in the 1830s and 1840s, there is no documentation of experiments on electric light in the Kingdom of Hanover in the 1840s and no source for deliveries of equipment or any other kind of relation of Henry Goebel to today's Leibniz University Hannover.

As one result of investigations in Germany and in the US and an analysis of all documents of the litigations with Goebel-Defense Hans-Christian Rohde stated in his dissertation, that there is no source from the time prior to 1880 to support the assumption of a relation of Henry Goebel to incandescent lamps prior to 1880. His thesis is, that Henry Goebel got the knowledge when working for the American Electric Light Co. in 1881 and was not busy with incandescent lamps before.

A philological analysis of all affidavits of the Goebel-Defense manifested numerous contradictions and improbabilities. This and the lack of independent sources in the archives to confirm claims of Henry Goebel support the thesis, the Goebel-Defense was fraudulent. Probably Goebel told his story in 1882 to present himself as experienced in the art of construction of electric lamps to promote his intended business. Patent attorneys and their technical consultants created the Goebel-Defense on base of this story. Probably a biography of an inventor of electric light was constructed on top of the true biography of Henry Goebel. There is circumstantial evidence that falsification of written affidavits was part of the strategy of the counsels of the defense.

One curious matter is the name of Goebel's alleged teacher, Professor Münchhausen. Münchhausen is a rare family name in Germany and Münchhausen is the name of a literary figure in a collection of tales with title The Surprising Adventures of Baron Munchausen of Rudolf Erich Raspe  (published 1785) and in another version of Gottfried August Bürger (published 1786), a popular book in Germany; a man telling lies and incredible stories. A  thesis on this is, that Henry Goebel, an old man, was under pressure of lawyers to provide affidavits and got pangs of conscience and this was his way to indicate the story was untrue. In the culture of Germany there is a close association of "Münchhausen" and "untrue, telling lies".

So-called Goebel Original Lamps are in the archives of the Henry Ford Museum, Dearborn.  A technical examination with today's methods of science to establish, if possible,  a final truth on the production year of the lamps and to clear up technical points of dispute in the litigations did not take place yet.

The Goebel-Legend 

Franklin Leonard Pope was a close friend of Thomas Alva Edison but later he was in quarrel with him.

He was an important man with a good reputation in the field of electricity; in 1886 he was the President of the American Institute of Electrical Engineers.

In January 1893 Franklin Pope wrote an article published on the head page of the Electrical Engineer titled The Carbon Filament Lamp of 1859—The Story of an Overlooked Invention. In this article Franklin Pope credited the invention of the practical incandescent light bulb to Henry Goebel. Furthermore, he supported the Goebel-Defense at court providing affidavits.

Probably his relationship to Thomas Edison was the motivation of Franklin Pope.

The reputation of Franklin Pope and his article in The Electrical Engineer is the reason for the existing view in some countries that Henry Goebel developed a carbon filament lamp many years before Thomas Edison did it. The Electrical Engineer is available in the libraries of many technical universities. Franklin Pope's article was interpreted as a reliable source as well in the year of publishing as in later years. In 1893 his article was the source for reports about the Goebel-Story of newspapers in the US and in Europe.

As a matter of fact there is a lack of convincing evidence for the information about the lamps of Henry Goebel given by Franklin Pope in his article. This was the result of the litigations (motions for a preliminary injunction) in three cases in 1893 and 1894.

In a dissertation published 2007 it is stated, that the article was part of the fraudulent Goebel-Defense and the intention was to produce credibility for the Goebel-Story and sympathy for Henry Goebel, an "underdog" who anticipated the famous Thomas Edison. According to this view, Franklin Pope was a fraudulent acting consultant of the Goebel Defense.

Franklin Pope wrote a book titled Evolution of the Electric Incandescent Lamp. In the 2nd Edition of this book, published 1894 one year after his article about Henry Goebel in the Electrical Engineer of January 1893, Henry Goebel is not mentioned.

In the case Edison Electric Light Co. vs. Columbia Incandescent Lamp Co. Judge Moses Hallett denied the granting of a preliminary injunction. His opinion was, that a final hearing with all witnesses at court was necessary. Several magazines and newspapers stated that Judge Hallett believed Goebel's lamp preceded Edison's. In Germany the opinion of Judge Hallett was reported to be a final decision in the case. Sometimes it wasn't realized that the litigations were three independent cases with the same counsels of the defense using the same arguments. Due to this erroneous view the later decision of Judge Hallett  was reported as a decision of a higher court in the same case. That are misstatements of Judge Hallett's decision, and the source of the legend that the priority of Henry Goebel for the invention of the practical incandescent light bulb was established at court.

After his death, Henry Goebel had been forgotten for 30 years in Germany. In the year 1923 the story of an important national inventor was created; the report of Franklin Pope was the main source. Some other countries adapted the story from Germany in the 20th century. Additional misstatements became part of some versions of the legend. For example, some versions of the legend describe the first Goebel lamps as bottle-lamps. But Henry Goebel said that he had melted the glass of Eau-de-Cologne-Bottles with a blowpipe to produce the all-glass-envelope of his very first lamps in the 1850s.

Different views became obvious due to the internet and some projects in the US and in Germany  started investigations in the year 2000 and later. As a result, the assumption of Goebel lamps prior to 1880 without any doubt was named a legend.

US-Patents granted to Henry Goebel 
Patent 47.632 "Hemmer for Sewing Machines", May 9, 1865
Patent 252.658 "Vacuum Pump (Improvement of the Geissler-System of vacuum pumps", January 24, 1882
Patent 266.358 "Electric Incandescent Lamp (sockets to connect the filament of carbon and the conducting wires)", October 24, 1882

See also 

 List of German inventors and discoverers

References

Bibliography 
 Hans-Christian Rohde: Die Göbel-Legende – Der Kampf um die Erfindung der Glühlampe. Zu Klampen, Springe 2007,  (German, dissertation, research work on the biography of Henry Goebel, analysis of all documents of the Goebel-Defense available in National Record Administrations of the USA) The author explains his thesis, the Goebel claims were fraudulent.
 Decisions of the courts concerning the Goebel-Defense published in the Federal Reporter volumes f1.54, f1.56, f1.57, f1. 60, f1.61 und f1.65:
 Edison Electric Light v. Beacon vol. 54, pg. 678
 Edison Electric Light v. Columbia vol. 56, pg. 496
 Edison Electric Light v. Electric, Oconto vol. 57, pg. 616
 Electric, Oconto v. Edison Electric Light appeal vol. 61, pg. 834
 Edison Electric Light v. Philadelphia Trust vol. 60, pg. 397
 Philadelphia Trust v. Edison Electric Light appeal vol. 65, pg. 551
 Reports about the Goebel-Defense are available in many issues of The Electrical World and The Electrical Engineer in 1893 and 1894.
 Frank Dittmann: Heinrich Goebel – Aufstieg und Fall einer deutschen Legende. In: Technikgeschichte. 74, 2 (2007): 149–160,  (Heinrich Goebel - rise and fall of a German legend.)

External links 
 Edward Covington: A Review of the Henry Goebel Defense
 Edward Covington: Goebel Original and Reproduced Lamps
 Frank Levis Dyer u. A.: Edison his life and inventions 1929/Henry Goebel Defense of 1893
 Goebel Stamp 2004, Germany, designed by Stefan Klein and Olaf Neumann

1818 births
1893 deaths
Burials at Green-Wood Cemetery
American electrical engineers
German electrical engineers
19th-century American inventors
German emigrants to the United States
People from the Kingdom of Hanover
Engineers from Hanover